The 2018 Oklahoma City mayoral election took place on February 13, 2018, to elect the Mayor of Oklahoma City. The election was won by David Holt. Since Holt won a majority in the initial round of the election, a runoff was not required.

Incumbent mayor Mick Cornett did not seek a fifth term as mayor.

Results

First round

References

Oklahoma City
Oklahoma City
Mayoral elections in Oklahoma City